Markvart of Úlice was a hetman of Sigismund of Luxembourg. He was the leader of an army from Prague that besieged Kutná Hora at the behest of Sigismund in 1402. His soldiers razed and pillaged much of the area around the town. He died after being struck by an arrow during the siege of Suchdol on 27 December 1402.

In popular culture
A fictionalized Markvart is an antagonist in the 2018 video game Kingdom Come: Deliverance. Referenced in-game as Sir Markvart von Aulitz, he is depicted leading an attack on Silver Skalitz which directly influences the events of the game.

References

1402 deaths
Medieval Bohemian nobility
15th-century Bohemian people